Judy Parker is a record producer. She co-wrote The Four Seasons' LP Who Loves You and "December 1963 (Oh, What A Night)" with her husband, songwriter Bob Gaudio (one of the original Four Seasons), who produced the albums.

References

American record producers
Living people
Year of birth missing (living people)
Place of birth missing (living people)
20th-century American women